The Cabinet of Bjarni Benediktsson in Iceland was formed 14 November 1963. It dissolved 10 July 1970 due to the death of the Prime Minister, Bjarni Benediktsson, who was killed in a house fire the night before along with his wife and grandson.

Cabinets

Inaugural cabinet: 14 November 1963 – 8 May 1965

First reshuffle: 8 May 1965 – 31 August 1965
Magnús Jónsson replaced Gunnar Thoroddsen as Minister of Finance.

Second reshuffle: 31 August 1965 – 1 January 1970
Eggert Gíslason Þorsteinsson replaced Emil Jónsson as Minister of Fisheries and Minister of Social Affairs. Emil Jónsson replaced Guðmundur Ívarsson Guðmundsson as Minister for Foreign Affairs.

Third reshuffle: 1 January 1970 – 10 July 1970
The Cabinet of Iceland Act no. 73/1969, which had been passed by the parliament 28 May 1969, took effect on 1 January 1970. Thus the Cabinet was formally established along with its ministries which had up until then not formally existed separately from the ministers. The Ministry of Health (Heilbrigðisráðuneytið) was renamed the Ministry of Health and Social Security (Heilbrigðis- og tryggingamálaráðherra) and Eggert Gíslason Þorsteinsson replaced Jóhann Hafstein as minister. Emil Jónsson replaced Jóhann Hafstein as Minister of Social Affairs. Statistics Iceland became a cabinet ministry and was led by Magnús Jónsson.

See also
Government of Iceland
Cabinet of Iceland

References

Bjarni Benediktsson, Cabinet of
Bjarni Benediktsson, Cabinet of
Bjarni Benediktsson, Cabinet of
Cabinets established in 1963
Cabinets disestablished in 1970
Independence Party (Iceland)